Sligo Steam Navigation Company was formed in 1865. It provided weekly sailings between Glasgow and Liverpool. The company was formed out of Messrs. Middleton and Pollexfen a trading partnership based in Sligo. The company was one of the last three independent cross channel Irish shipping companies still operational in the 1930s. In 1936 Coast Lines Ltd bought Sligo Steamship Navigation Company.

Company history
The company offices were based in Wine street in the town.

Vessels operated by the company included the SS Killarney (1857), the SS Glasgow (1867), the SS Sligo(1889), SS Liverpool, SS Sligo (1913), SS Carrickfergus, the SS Sligo (1930) and SS Tartar (1899).

The SS Sligo (1889) was wrecked in Sligo bay during a storm in 1912.

The SS Liverpool, the biggest vessel operated by the company, was built by Messrs John Jones & Sons and was 686 gross tons. She was designed by the naval architect Henry H West. She was designed to sit below the harbour wall level in Sligo.

The live animal export trade dominated in the later years of the company. The SS Sligo (1930) was launched on 30 July of that year from the slipways of the Alexandra basin in Dublin port. She had pens for 275 head of cattle and 500 sheep could be accommodated on deck. She also had refrigerated holds for dairy produce.

Sinking of the SS Liverpool
The steamship SS Liverpool was lost off the south coast of the Isle of Man on 16 December 1916, after hitting a mine laid by a German submarine. The mine had been laid the previous day by U-80 commanded by the 34 year old Kapitänleutnant Alfred von Glasenapp. There were sixteen crewmen of which two were killed. The sole passenger on board also died. The men lost were Daniel Garvey, aged 44, from Finisklin, Sligo, a winchman or "donkey engine man" and was presumed drowned, James Costello, age 31, from Riverside, Sligo, a fireman killed by the explosion.  Both men left a wife and children.  J P Gillen, from Rosses Point, was the only passenger, returning home for the Christmas holidays who drowned.

As of December 1996 the wreck has been identified by divers from the Isle of Man.

The company became embroiled in the 1913 Sligo Dock strike.

In 1922 the SS Tartar was commandeered by the Free State government for operations in the north Sligo area against anti-treaty forces.

References

Steamships of the Republic of Ireland